Wymysłów  (former German name Wimslau) is a village in the administrative district of Gmina Świerklaniec, within Tarnowskie Góry County, Silesian Voivodeship, in southern Poland.

The village has a population of 572.

References

Gmina Swierklaniec